Babingtonia fascifolia is a shrub endemic to Western Australia.

It is found in a small area in the Wheatbelt region of Western Australia between Mingenew, Morawa and Three Springs.

References

Eudicots of Western Australia
fascifolia
Endemic flora of Western Australia
Plants described in 2015
Taxa named by Barbara Lynette Rye